Duf is a village in the municipality of Mavrovo and Rostuša, North Macedonia.

Demographics
As of the 2021 census, Duf had 30 residents with the following ethnic composition:
Albanians 22
Macedonians 4
Persons for whom data are taken from administrative sources 4

According to the 2002 census, the village had a total of 39 inhabitants. Ethnic groups in the village include:

Albanians 37
Macedonians 2

References

Villages in Mavrovo and Rostuša Municipality
Albanian communities in North Macedonia